Boggs is a surname. Notable people with the surname include:

 Brandon Boggs (born 1983), American baseball left fielder for the Texas Rangers and Milwaukee Brewers
 Brent Boggs (born 1955), American Democratic politician, member of the West Virginia House of Delegates (from 1997)
 Carol L. Boggs (born 1952), American biologist
 Carroll C. Boggs (1844–1923), American jurist
 Charles S. Boggs (1811–1888), United States Navy admiral
 Danny Julian Boggs (born 1944), American judge
 David Boggs (born 1950), American electrical and radio engineer, co-inventor of the Ethernet technology
 David Ray Boggs (born 1943), American stock car racing driver
 Dock Boggs, (1898–1971) American banjo player and singer
 Eli Boggs, American pirate in the 19th century
 Elizabeth Monroe Boggs (1913–1996), founder of the National Association for Retarded Children (Arc of the United States)
 Francis Boggs (1870–1911), American stage actor and pioneer silent film director
 Gail Boggs (born 1951), American actress
 George Arthur Boggs (1891–1968), Canadian politician, member of the Nova Scotia House of Assembly (1953–1956)
 Gil Boggs, Artistic Director of Colorado Ballet (from 2006)
 Grace Lee Boggs, American social activist
 Hale Boggs (Thomas Hale Boggs Sr.; 1914–1973), U.S. Congressman (1962–1973)
 Hampton E. Boggs (1921–1953), American fighter pilot
 Haskell Boggs (1909–2003), American cinematographer
 Henrietta Boggs (1918–2020), Costa Rican-American author, journalist, and activist, wife of the President of Costa Rica José Figueres Ferrer, First Lady of Costa Rica (1948–1949)
 Henry C. Boggs (1820–1898), farmer, businessman and banker who was prominent in Lake County, California
 J. Caleb Boggs (1909–1993), American Republican politician who served as the state of Delaware's Governor, US Representative and US Senator
 James Boggs (disambiguation), several people
 Jean Sutherland Boggs (1922–2014), Canadian art historian
 Kristin Boggs, American politician, member of the Ohio House of Representatives (from 2016)
 Larry Boggs (born 1946), American politician, member of the Oklahoma Senate (from 2012)
 Lilburn Boggs (1796–1860), 6th Governor of Missouri from 1836 to 1840
 Lindy Boggs (1916–2013), American congresswoman, 1973–1991
 Lynette Boggs (born 1963), American Republican politician, Miss Oregon 1989, member of the Las Vegas City Council (1999–2004) and the Clark County Commission (2004–2006)
 Mark Boggs (born 1964), American football player
 Mary Boggs (also known as Mary Ross Boggs and Mary Ross Townley; 1920–2002), American muralist and textbook author
 Michael Boggs (disambiguation), several people
 Mitchell Boggs (born 1984), American baseball pitcher
 Paula Boggs, American philanthropist, public speaker, and musician
 Phil Boggs (Phillip George Boggs; 1949–1990), American Olympic diver
 Ray Boggs (1904–1989), American baseball pitcher for the Boston Braves
 Redd Boggs (1921–1996), American science fiction fanzine writer
 Richard Boggs (1933–2003), American neurologist, convicted murderer
 Ross Boggs, American Democratic politician, member of the Ohio House of Representatives (1983–1999)
 Samuel Whittemore Boggs (1889–1954), American geographer and cartographer who developed the Boggs eumorphic projection
 Stanley Boggs (1910–1991) American archaeologist
 Taylor Boggs (born 1987), American football center
 Tex Boggs (born 1938), American politician, member of the Wyoming Senate (1999–2006), President of Western Wyoming Community College
 Thomas Boggs (1944–2008), American restaurateur and musician, member of the rock band the Box Tops
 Thomas Hale Boggs Jr. (1941–2014), American attorney and lobbyist
 Tom Boggs (poet) (1905–1952), American poet, editor, and novelist
 Tommy Boggs (Thomas Winton Boggs; born 1955), American baseball pitcher for Texas Rangers and Atlanta Braves
 Wade Boggs (born 1958), former Major League Baseball third baseman
 William Boggs (disambiguation), several people
 William Benton Boggs (1854–1922), American politician
 Winthrop Smillie Boggs (1902–1974), American philatelist
 Zak Boggs (born 1986), American soccer player

Fictional characters
Randall Boggs, in the 2001 animated film Monsters, Inc. and in its 2013 prequel Monsters University

See also
Bogs (name), given name and surname